Wingerter is a German surname. Notable people with the surname include:

Benjamin Wingerter (born 1983), German footballer
George Wingerter (1904–1994), American racing driver
Jacob Philip Wingerter (1833–1916), German Protestant evangelist and presbyter

German-language surnames